Lewis Collins (27 May 1946 – 27 November 2013) was an English actor, best known for his career-defining role playing 'Bodie' in the late 1970s – early 1980s British television series The Professionals.

Early life
Collins was born in Bidston, Birkenhead, on the Wirral Peninsula in Cheshire, now Merseyside. At the age of two he won 'The Most Beautiful Baby in Liverpool' contest. He was educated at Gautby Road Primary School and Grange School in Birkenhead, and the Birkenhead Institute School.

When he was 13 years of age, his father Bill, a jazz dance band leader, bought him a drum kit. His first gig was playing with his father's band, and he also joined a group of older school pupils to form a band called The Renegades at the start of the Merseybeat music scene in Liverpool in the late 1950s. His passion for firearms started in his youth from a membership of the Liverpool Central Rifle Club. On leaving school, he took an apprentice hairdresser's position at the Andre Bernard Salon, alongside fellow apprentice Mike McCartney (stage name Mike McGear – later a member of the comedy, music and poetry trio The Scaffold). In the same period Collins was writing songs with Mike McCartney, and when the drummer Pete Best was dropped from the Beatles, Mike McCartney suggested Collins as a possible replacement to his elder brother Paul McCartney. Turning down the option of an audition with The Beatles, Collins continued playing music on an amateur basis for a number of local bands, including The Eyes, and The Georgians.

In late 1964, Collins quit hairdressing to become the bass player with The Mojos (which his father managed), performing on their charting singles "Goodbye Dolly Gray" and "Until My Baby Comes Home", and moved from Liverpool to London with them when the band appeared to have good commercial prospects. However the band failed to chart again and broke up, and finding himself in the midst of cosmopolitan London in 1966 during the Swinging Sixties, Collins made a living engaged in temping work such as delivery van driving, cleaning windows and being a waiter, before deciding that he wanted to become an actor after hearing a play being performed on the radio.

Having been accepted for training in acting by the London Academy of Music and Dramatic Art, which he attended between 1968 and 1971, he drew the notice of his fellow students for an "electrifying" performance in the lead role of Shakespeare's Romeo and Juliet.

Theatre career
On graduation from LAMDA Collins joined the Chesterfield Civic Theatre's Repertory Company in 1971, moving to the company of the Citizen’s Theatre, in Glasgow in 1972 under the director Giles Havergal. While in Glasgow he also taught deaf and mute children mobility skills, learning British sign language so he could communicate with them, later saying that this was the most satisfying work that he had done in his life. In 1972, he appeared in seven plays in Glasgow including the lead in Marlowe's Tamburlaine the Great. He then went with Havergal on an acting teaching tour with the Prospect Theatre Company in the United States and Canada, before returning to the British Isles to appear in London's West End, starring in City Sugar and The Threepenny Opera, and at the Royal Court Theatre in the play The Farm in 1973, directed by Lindsay Anderson.

After moving into film acting in the mid-1970s, he intermittently returned to the stage throughout his career. He performed in a pantomime of Babes in the Wood at the King's Theatre in Southsea in Christmas 1983. In the mid-1990s he performed in an English provincial tour of the play Who killed Agatha Christie by Tudor Gates. His last performance in theatre was a 1999–2000 provincial tour in the English Midlands of J.B. Priestley's Dangerous Corner.

Move into television
While appearing in The Farm at the Royal Court in 1973 Collins received an offer for his first television role in the British Broadcasting Corporation's police drama Z Cars. His first major television role was in Granada Television's comedy series The Cuckoo Waltz from 1975 to 1977 in the role of Gavin Rumsey, alongside his landlord played by David Roper and landlady Diane Keen, whom his character was constantly trying to seduce. By the mid-1970s he was regularly appearing on British television dramas in multiple roles.

The Professionals (1977–1983)
In 1976, the dramatist and television producer Brian Clemens wrote a new British television crime-action drama series entitled The Professionals, modelled on the success of the hit American television series Starsky and Hutch. It was also intended to be a more realistic follow-up to a prior successful television series that he had just produced about government agents entitled The New Avengers.

As with the previous series, Clemens planned to have a split leads casting arrangement for the new show. Having cast the actor Martin Shaw, Clemens found in the first week of filming that the initial partnership he had arranged for the recording of the pilot episode with the actor Anthony Andrews lacked personal on-screen chemistry due to the similarity of the acting styles of Andrews and Shaw. He thought of Collins as an alternative after seeing a recently filmed episode of The New Avengers, in which Collins and Shaw (both trained at LAMDA) had appeared alongside one another and there had been a noticeable dynamic tension between them, both in their acting style and off-screen private personalities. After a screen test of Collins, he replaced Anthony Andrews as 'William Bodie'. Although not getting on particularly well with one another personally, the good-humoured antagonism and bravado between Collins and Shaw on-screen worked well and the series was highly successful on British television for the next six years, making household names of them both. The production came to an end in 1981, although new episodes continued to be shown onscreen until early 1983.

Military career
Collins was a private in the 10th Battalion Parachute Regiment of the British Army (a Territorial Army unit) from 1979 to 1983. In 1983, he applied to join the Territorial SAS, but was rejected because of his celebrity status, despite passing the entrance tests. From 15 to 23 March 1980 Collins with several volunteers from the Parachute Regiment, along with the British boxer John Conteh, took part in a forced march in military service conditions from London to Liverpool up the A41 road, the funds raised from the event being donated to a charity for disabled children.

Acting career (1980s–1990s)
In the 1980s, he auditioned for the role of 007 with Eon Productions, the producers of the James Bond cinema franchise, to succeed Roger Moore, but the audition with its producer Cubby Broccoli did not go well and he was rejected as being "too aggressive". Collins regarded this failure in retrospect as the key missed opportunity of his acting career. In 1982 he moved into cinema starring in the role of a British Army officer confronting terrorists in the film Who Dares Wins.

As the 1980s progressed Collins attempted to maintain a cinematic career. An initial plan to continue to make feature films with the Who Dares Wins producer Euan Lloyd, including one set in the Falklands War provisionally entitled Task Force South, came to nothing, so he instead signed a German-Italian co-production contract to star in three mercenary war genre feature films directed by Antonio Margheriti set in the Third World, viz., Code Name: Wild Geese (1984), Kommando Leopard (1985) and Der Commander (1988), which attempted to capitalise on the recent box-office hits of The Wild Geese and The Dogs of War. They were commercially unsuccessful; as a result he returned to working in British television productions.

In 1986 he played the French medieval war-lord Philip Marc in the series Robin of Sherwood. In 1988 he played second lead to Michael Caine in the British television film Jack the Ripper.

At the start of the 1990s, he appeared in the role of "Colonel Mustard" in the British television drama/gameshow Cluedo (1991–92), however acting roles became sparser as the decade progressed. In the early 1990s, seeking to extend his career options in drama to work beyond acting he attended courses in screenwriting and direction at the UCLA School of Theater, Film and Television in Los Angeles, California, US, but this led to no subsequent professional employment. In the mid-1990s he moved his family to Los Angeles, where he was residing part-time, while he returned to England intermittently for the occasional provincial theatre tour and minor acting roles in television productions.

In March 1997, Collins announced in an interview on British television that he was in discussions with a production company to star in a new series based on The Professionals, reprising his career signature role of William Bodie as the CI5 Agency's Chief in the part played by Gordon Jackson in the original series. However, after months of negotiations it was announced by the producer David Wickes that Collins had been dropped as a casting option for the role for undisclosed reasons, and it had been given to the actor Edward Woodward instead. The new show, entitled CI5:The New Professionals, went on to be a commercial and critical failure, and only ran for one series.

Collins' final acting performance was in an episode of the British television police drama seriesThe Bill entitled "034" in 2002.

Final years
In 2003, Collins left Britain and abandoned acting and drama, and saw out his last decade in private business in the United States, selling computer equipment.

In early 2012, his return to acting was announced by his theatrical agent issuing a statement that he had been cast to play the role of the Earl Godwin in the historically based feature film production 1066, but in June 2013, it was announced by the same source that he had withdrawn from the production due to ill health.

Death
After being first diagnosed in 2008, Collins died at the age of 67 from cancer, in Los Angeles on 27 November 2013. Shortly before his death, he had returned to visit the United Kingdom, spending some time in Merseyside.

Collins' body was cremated. An urn holding his ashes is deposited in a memorial display cabinet at the North Pacifica Mausoleum section of Green Hills Memorial Park in Rancho Palos Verdes, California.

Personal life
Collins married Michelle Larrett, a school-teacher, in 1992. The couple had three sons; Elliot, Oliver,  and Cameron.

He held a private pilot's licence, a black belt in jujitsu and had trained in karate. His hobbies included parachuting, motorbikes, collecting firearms and sports shooting and he continued to play musical instruments throughout his life.

TV roles 
 Z-Cars, episode "Waste", 1974 – as Derek Cunningham
 Marked Personal, episodes "1.38" and "1.37", 1974 – as Len Thomas
 Village Hall, episode "Friendly Encounter", 1974 – Jimmy Jackson
 Crown Court, episode "Arson", 1974 – as PC Henry Williams
 Warship, episode "Away Seaboat's Crew", 1974 – L/Sea. Steele
 The Cuckoo Waltz, Granada TV sitcom, 1975–1977 – as Gavin Ramsey
 The New Avengers, Series 2 – episode 5 "Obsession", (with Martin Shaw), 7 October 1977 – as Kilner
 The Professionals, 1977–1981 – as Bodie
 Must Wear Tights (TV musical), 1978 - as Lewis Blake
 This Is Your Life, 1 episode, 1982 – as himself
 A Night on the Town, 1983 – as George, a photographer
 Robin of Sherwood, episode "The Sheriff of Nottingham", 1986 – as Phillip Mark
 Carly's Web, 1987 – as Alexander Prescott
 Jack the Ripper, TV Drama, 1988 – as Sergeant George Godley
 Alfred Hitchcock Presents, episode "The Man Who Knew Too Little", 1989 – as Bill Stewart
 , TV series, 1990 – as Hugh Sinclair (segment "Bounty")
 A Ghost in Monte Carlo, TV Drama, 1990 – as Lord Drayton
 Cluedo, 6 episodes, 1991–1992 – as Col. Mustard; 1 episode as Jack Peacock
 Tarzán, 2 episodes, 1993–1994 – as Michael Hauser
 The Grimleys, 2 episodes, 1999 – as Digby's Dad
 The Bill, episode 034, 2002 – Dr. Peter Allen (final appearance)

Cinematic roles 
 Confessions of a Driving Instructor (1976) – (Extra as No.10 in the red- shirted rugby team)
 Who Dares Wins (1982) – Captain Peter Skellen
 Code Name: Wild Geese (1984) – Capt. Robin Wesley
 Commando Leopard (1985) – Enrique Carrasco
  (1988) – Maj. Jack Colby

References

External links 

 Official Lewis Collins website

1946 births
2013 deaths
People from Birkenhead
British hairdressers
Alumni of the London Academy of Music and Dramatic Art
English male stage actors
English male television actors
English male film actors
English expatriates in the United States
UCLA Film School alumni
English aviators
Deaths from cancer in California
English bass guitarists
English male guitarists
Male bass guitarists